William Edward Dickson (26 April 1893 – 22 May 1966) was an English-born Australian politician.

Early life
Dickson was born at Widnes in Lancashire to alkali labourer Edward Dickson and Bertha Stancliffe. He migrated to Australia in 1913 and worked as an accountant for a mine in Broken Hill. He lost his job after opposing conscription during World War I, and worked as a labourer and then as manager of the Barrier Daily Truth. On 22 October 1922 he married Alice Celia Cogan, with whom he had five children.

Political career
He then moved to Sydney, and from 1925 to 1934 was a Labor member of the New South Wales Legislative Council. Involved in Bob Heffron's Industrial Labor Party, he soon returned to the ALP and was general secretary from 1940 to 1941 and campaign director from 1940 to 1952. He returned to the Legislative Council in 1940, where he would remain until his death. He was an assistant minister from 1941 to 1948, and from 1948 to 1952 was Minister for Building Materials, with his title changed to include additional responsibilities as Minister for Secondary Industries from 1950. In 1949 he was appointed Secretary for Mines in addition to his previous portfolios. He resigned from the ministry in 1952 when he was elected President of the Legislative Council. He retained the presidency until his death at Vaucluse in 1966.

References

 

|-

1893 births
1966 deaths
Australian Labor Party members of the Parliament of New South Wales
Members of the New South Wales Legislative Council
Presidents of the New South Wales Legislative Council
20th-century Australian politicians
People from Widnes
British emigrants to Australia